Hockey Club Galkan, is a Turkmen professional ice hockey team based in Ashgabat, Turkmenistan. It is the team of the Ministry of Internal Affairs of Turkmenistan. The first Turkmenistan ice hockey champion (2013/2014), the first owner of the Hockey Cup of the Turkmenistan Ministry of the Interior (2013).

References

2013 establishments in Turkmenistan
Ice hockey clubs established in 2013
Ice hockey teams in Turkmenistan
Sport in Turkmenistan